Oligolochus is a genus of flower weevils in the beetle family Curculionidae. There are about 12 described species in Oligolochus.

Species
These 12 species belong to the genus Oligolochus:

 Oligolochus albosignatus Kuschel, 1983
 Oligolochus bracatoides Prena, 2009
 Oligolochus bracatus (Casey, 1892)
 Oligolochus convexus (LeConte, 1876)
 Oligolochus deletangi Kuschel, 1983
 Oligolochus longipennis Linell
 Oligolochus minuens (Casey, 1920)
 Oligolochus ornatus (Casey, 1920)
 Oligolochus ovulatus (Casey, 1920)
 Oligolochus robustus Linell & M.L., 1897
 Oligolochus seclusus (Casey, 1892)
 Oligolochus vicarius (Blatchley, 1928)

References

Further reading

 
 
 

Baridinae
Articles created by Qbugbot